James Alexander Lindsay  (20 June 1856, in Fintona, County Tyrone – 14 December 1931, in Belfast) was a British physician and professor of medicine, known for his collection Medical axioms, aphorisms, and clinical memoranda (1923, London, H. K. Lewis & Co., Ltd).

Biography
After education at the Royal Belfast Academical Institution and at the Methodist College Belfast, James Alexander Lindsay matriculated at Queen's College Belfast, where he graduated in 1877 B.A. and in 1878 M.A. in ancient classics. In 1882 he obtained the M.D. and M.Ch. degrees in the Royal University of Ireland.

After two years of working in clinics in London, in Paris, and in Vienna, he returned to Belfast. At the Royal Victoria Hospital, Belfast, he was appointed in 1884 assistant physician and in 1888 full physician, retiring as consulting physician in 1921. From 1919 to 1927 he was chair of the board of management of the Royal Victoria Hospital. From 1899 to 1924 he held the chair of medicine in Queen's University Belfast. In the chair of medicine he was preceded by James Cuming (1833–1899) and succeeded by William Willis Dalziel Thomson.

In 1897–1898 Lindsay was president of the Ulster Medical Society. In 1903 he was elected FRCP. In 1909 he delivered the Bradshaw Lecture.

His nephew, Royal Navy Captain D. C. Lindsay, was High Sheriff of Belfast for the year 1931. J. A. Lindsay and his nephew were descendants of James Lindsay, who fled from religion persecution in Ayrshire in 1678.

Selected publications

Articles

Books
with James Cuthbert Lindsay: 

; 2nd edition 1906

References

External links
 

1856 births
1931 deaths
People educated at the Royal Belfast Academical Institution
People educated at Methodist College Belfast
Alumni of Queen's University Belfast
Academics of Queen's University Belfast
19th-century British medical doctors
20th-century British medical doctors
Fellows of the Royal College of Physicians